The following is a list of county roads in Dixie County, Florida.  All county roads are maintained by the county in which they reside, however not all of them are marked with standard MUTCD approved county road shields.

List of County Roads in Dixie County, Florida

References

FDOT Map of Dixie County
FDOT GIS data, accessed January 2014

 
County